The Saint Eulália Church (Portuguese: Igreja de Santa Eulália) is a Romanesque Portuguese church in Tenões, Braga, Portugal, near Bom Jesus.

The church is dedicated to Saint Eulalia.

It is classified by IPPAR. since 1967.

References

Roman Catholic churches in Braga
Romanesque architecture in Portugal
Properties of Public Interest in Portugal